
Year 345 BC was a year of the pre-Julian Roman calendar. At the time it was known as the Year of the Consulship of Dorsuo and Camerinus (or, less frequently, year 409 Ab urbe condita). The denomination 345 BC for this year has been used since the early medieval period, when the Anno Domini calendar era became the prevalent method in Europe for naming years.

Events 
 By place 

 Greece 
 Supported by Thebes and Thessaly, Macedonia takes over Phocis' votes in the Amphictyonic League, a Greek religious organisation formed to support the greater temples of Apollo and Demeter. Despite some reluctance on the part of the Athenian leaders, Athens finally accepts Philip II's entry into the Council of the League. The Athenian statesman Demosthenes is among those who recommend this stance in his oration On the Peace.

 India 
 The Nanda Empire is founded in Magadha.

 Italy 
 Carthaginians ravage and blockade Entella.

Births

Deaths 
 Nicochares, Athenian poet of the Old Comedy
 Mahanandin, last king of the Shishunaga dynasty of the Indian subcontinent.

References